Haliyala is a town in Uttara Kannada in the Indian state of Karnataka. It is the headquarters town for Haliyal Taluk. It can be classified as a main-road town.

Geography

Haliyal has an average elevation of 559 metres (1834 feet).

Demographics
In the 2001 Indian census, Haliyal had a population of 20,652. Males constituted 51% of the population. Haliyal had an average literacy rate of 66%, higher than the national average (59.5%); male literacy was 72%, and female literacy was 60%.  In 2001 in Haliyal, 13% of the population was under 6 years of age. Kannada is the main language spoken in the city.

Media 
 Karwar eNews is a major local newspaper in the region.

See also
 Dandeli
 Supa Dam
 Ulavi
 Sathodi Falls
 Kali River

References

Cities and towns in Uttara Kannada district
Forts in Karnataka